Pleurotinae is a subfamily of moths in the family Oecophoridae.

Genera
 Minetia Leraut, 1991
 Pleurota Hübner, [1825]
 Holoscolia Zeller, 1839
 Aplota Stephens, 1834

References

Pleurotinae at funet

 
Oecophoridae
Moth subfamilies